WWF Betrayal is a beat 'em up on the Game Boy Color based on the World Wrestling Federation (WWF). It was the third and last WWF game released to the Game Boy Color and one of a few games based on the promotion that was of a different genre than the regular professional wrestling games usually produced.

The game's plot was roughly based on a storyline in 1999 where Stephanie McMahon gets kidnapped. Her father Vince McMahon promises to grant the player a shot at the WWF Championship if they manage to save her. The player must then fight through a series of side-scrolling levels to rescue Stephanie. The player can play as Stone Cold Steve Austin, The Rock, Triple H, or The Undertaker.

Reception

The game received "generally mixed" reviews according to video game review aggregator GameRankings.

See also
List of licensed wrestling video games
List of fighting games

References

External links
 

2001 video games
Beat 'em ups
Game Boy Color games
Game Boy Color-only games
WWE video games
THQ games
Professional wrestling games
WayForward games
Single-player video games
Video games developed in the United States